is a Japanese island in the Inland Sea. Administratively, it forms part of the city of Imabari, Ehime Prefecture.

Geography

History
During the Sengoku period, the island was the base of the Kurushima Murakami, one of the three main houses of the Murakami kaizoku (the others the Noshima Murakami and Innoshima Murakami). Around the end of the Kyōhō era in the early eighteenth century there were some seventy-eight households, fifty-three of them of fishermen. By Shōwa 53 (1978) this number had dropped to thirty-nine households, primarily making a living by commuting to the local shipyards and line fishing. As of 2009, Kurushima had thirty-two residents.

Related maps

See also

 Setonaikai National Park
 Noshima
 Innoshima

References

External links
  Japan's outlying islands (MLIT)
  Detailed maps of Setonaikai National Park (Ministry of the Environment; Kurushima is in 愛媛県地域（今治南）)

Imabari, Ehime
Islands of the Seto Inland Sea
Islands of Ehime Prefecture